Goodbye Solo is a 2006 South Korean television series starring Chun Jung-myung, Yoon So-yi, Kim Min-hee, Bae Jong-ok, Lee Jae-ryong, Kim Nam-gil (credited as Lee Han), and Na Moon-hee. It aired on KBS2 from March 1 to April 20, 2006 on Wednesdays and Thursdays at 21:55 for 16 episodes.

In the urban melodrama, seven lead characters of different generations and backgrounds are all haunted by loneliness; they gradually interact and form a "family" borne out of emotional connection and mutual understanding.

Renowned for her in-depth, realistic portrayals of ordinary lives, writer Noh Hee-kyung said that the drama's theme is that all human beings are beautiful just the way they are, simply by existing in the world.

Plot
Kim Min-ho (Chun Jung-myung) is the son of a rich business tycoon, but works as a bartender. Because he is illegitimate, he feels estranged from his family, and has a strained relationship with his father (Jang Yong), his older brother Min-jae (Kim Hyun-kyun), and especially his mother (Jung Ae-ri). Min-ho has been secretly in love for a long time with Chung Soo-hee (Yoon So-yi), an artist who is also the girlfriend of his best friend, Yoo Ji-an (Kim Nam-gil). Soo-hee despises her mother for her constantly changing partners, and thus is determined to be faithful to Ji-an, despite her growing attraction to Min-ho. Ji-an works as a secretary for Min-ho's father and his lies hide painful family secrets. Cheerful, seemingly frivolous Choi Mi-ri (Kim Min-hee) is a restaurant owner who is living with third-rate gangster Kang Ho-chul (Lee Jae-ryong). Despite their love for each other, Mi-ri agonizes over Ho-chul's refusal to marry her and her family's disapproval. Oh Young-sook (Bae Jong-ok), who calls herself "crazy," is a flamboyant and eccentric divorcee who recently moved next door to Mi-ri and Ho-chul's apartment. All these people are linked together by an old woman named Mi-young (Na Moon-hee), the mysterious owner of an eatery in the neighborhood, who hasn't spoken a single word in decades.

Cast

Main characters
Chun Jung-myung as Kim Min-ho
Yoon So-yi as Chung Soo-hee
Kim Min-hee as Choi Mi-ri
Bae Jong-ok as Oh Young-sook
Lee Jae-ryong as Kang Ho-chul
Kim Nam-gil as Yoo Ji-an
Na Moon-hee as Mi-young

Supporting characters
Jang Yong as Kim Joo-min
Jung Ae-ri as Park Kyung-hye
Kim Hyun-kyun as Kim Min-jae
Uhm Soo-jung as Im Ji-soo
Kim Mi-kyung as Ahn Hae-young
Yoon Yoo-sun as Lee Mi-ja
Park Ji-il as Young-sook's husband
Kim Tae-hoon as Shin Sik
Jang Tae-sung as Moodugi
Joo Jin-mo as Ji-ahn's father
So Do-bi as Yong-woon

References

External links
 Goodbye Solo official KBS website 
 
 

2006 South Korean television series debuts
2006 South Korean television series endings
Korean Broadcasting System television dramas
Korean-language television shows
Television shows written by Noh Hee-kyung
South Korean mystery television series
South Korean romance television series